The Colorado School of Trades is a private for-profit school in Lakewood, Colorado that focuses exclusively on gunsmithing.  Graduates receive an Associate Degree. It was founded in 1947.

References

Schools in Colorado
Education in Jefferson County, Colorado
Education in Lakewood, Colorado
Gunsmiths
Vocational education in the United States